A palantír (in-universe ) is one of several indestructible crystal balls from J. R. R. Tolkien's epic-fantasy novel The Lord of the Rings. The word comes from Quenya palan 'far', and tir 'watch over'. The palantírs were used for communication and to see events in other parts of Arda, or in the past.

The palantíri were made by the Elves of Valinor in the First Age, as told in The Silmarillion. By the time of The Lord of the Rings at the end of the Third Age, a few palantíri remained in existence. They are used in some climactic scenes by major characters: Sauron, Saruman, Denethor the Steward of Gondor, and two members of the Fellowship of the Ring, Aragorn and Pippin.

A major theme of palantír usage is that while the stones show real objects or events, those using the stones had to "possess great strength of will and of mind" to direct the stone's gaze to its full capability. The stones were an unreliable guide to action, since what was not shown could be more important than what was selectively presented. A risk lay in the fact that users with sufficient power could choose what to show and what to conceal to other stones: in The Lord of the Rings, a palantír falls into the Enemy's hands making the usefulness of all other existing stones questionable. Commentators such as the Tolkien scholar Paul Kocher note the hand of providence in their usage, while Joseph Pearce compares Sauron's use of the stones to broadcast wartime propaganda. Tom Shippey suggests that the message is that "speculation", looking into any sort of magic mirror (Latin: speculum) or stone to see the future, rather than trusting in Providence, leads to error.

Fictional artefact

Origins

In Tolkien's high fantasy The Lord of the Rings, the palantíri were made by the Elves of Valinor in the Uttermost West, by the Noldor, apparently by Fëanor himself from silima, "that which shines". The number that he made is not stated, but there were at least eight. Seven of the stones given to Amandil of Númenor during the Second Age were saved by his son Elendil; he took them with him to Middle-earth, while at least the Master-stone remained behind.

Four were taken to Gondor, while three stayed in Arnor. Originally, the stones of Arnor were at Elostirion in the Tower Hills, Amon Sul (Weathertop), and Annuminas: the Elostirion stone, Elendil's own, looked only Westwards from Middle-earth across the ocean to the "Master-stone" at the "Tower of Avallonë upon Eressëa", an island off Valinor. The stones of Gondor were in Orthanc, Minas Tirith, Osgiliath, and Minas Ithil.

By the time of The Lord of the Rings, the stone of Orthanc was in the hands of the wizard Saruman, while the stone of Minas Ithil, (by then Minas Morgul, the city of the Nazgûl), had been taken by Sauron. That of Minas Tirith remained in the hands of the Steward of Gondor, Denethor. The stone of Osgiliath had been lost in the Anduin when the city was sacked.

Characteristics

A single palantír enabled its user to see places far off, or events in the past. A person could look into a palantír to communicate with anyone looking into another palantír. They could then see "visions of the things in the mind" of the person looking into the other stone.

The stones were made of a dark crystal, indestructible by any normal means, except perhaps the fire of Orodruin. They ranged in size from a diameter of about a foot (30 cm) to much larger stones that could not be lifted by one person. The Stone of Osgiliath had power over other stones including the ability to eavesdrop. The minor stones required one to move around them, thereby changing the viewpoint of its vision, whereas the major stones could be turned on their axis.

A wielder of great power such as Sauron could dominate a weaker user through the stone, which was the experience of Pippin Took and Saruman. Even one as powerful as Sauron could not make the palantíri "lie", or create false images; the most he could do was to selectively display truthful images to create a false impression in the viewer's mind. In The Lord of the Rings, four such uses of the stones are described, and in each case, a true image is shown, but the viewer draws a false conclusion from the facts. This applies to Sauron when he sees Pippin in Saruman's stone and assumes that Pippin has the One Ring, and that Saruman has therefore captured it. Denethor, too, is deceived through his use of a palantír, this time by Sauron, who drives Denethor to suicide by truthfully showing him the Black Fleet approaching Gondor, without telling him that the ships are crewed by Aragorn's troops, coming to Gondor's rescue. Shippey suggests that this consistent pattern is Tolkien's way of telling the reader that one should not "speculate" – the word meaning both to try to double-guess the future, and to look into a mirror (Latin: speculum 'glass or mirror') or crystal ball – but should trust in one's luck and make one's own mind up, courageously facing one's duty in each situation. 

The English literature scholar Paul Kocher similarly noted the hand of providence: Wormtongue's throwing of the stone providentially leads to Pippin's foolish look into the stone, which deceives Sauron; and it allows Aragorn to claim the stone and use it to deceive Sauron further. This leads him to assume that Aragorn has the One Ring. That in turn provokes Sauron into a whole series of what turn out to be disastrous actions: a premature attack on Minas Tirith; a rushed exit of the army of Minas Morgul, thus letting the hobbits through the pass of Cirith Ungol with the One Ring, and so on until the quest to destroy the ring succeeds against all odds.

The critic Jane Chance Nitzsche writes that Saruman's sin, in Christian terms, is to seek Godlike knowledge by gazing in a short-sighted way into the Orthanc palantír in the hope of rivalling Sauron, and, quoting Tolkien in The Two Towers, exploring "all those arts and subtle devices, for which he forsook his former wisdom". She explains that he is in this way giving up actual wisdom for "mere knowledge", imagining the arts were his own but in fact coming from Sauron. This prideful self-aggrandisement leads to his fall. She notes that it is ironic in this context that palantír means "far-sighted".

Joseph Pearce compares Sauron's use of the seeing stones to "broadcast propaganda and sow the seeds of despair among his enemies" with the communications technologies used to spread propaganda in the Second World War and then the Cold War, when Tolkien was writing.

In film 

A palantír appears in the film director Peter Jackson's The Lord of the Rings films. The Tolkien critic Allison Harl compares Jackson to Saruman, and his camera to a palantír, writing that "Jackson chooses to look through the perilous lens, putting his camera to use to exert control over the [original Tolkien] text." Harl cites Laura Mulvey's essay "Visual Pleasure and the Narrative Cinema" which describes "scopophilia", the voyeuristic pleasure of looking, based on Sigmund Freud's writings on sexuality. Harl gives as an example the sequence in The Two Towers where Jackson's camera "like the Evil Eye of Sauron" travels towards Saruman's tower, Isengard and "zooms into the dangerous palantír", in her opinion giving the cinema viewer "an omniscient and privileged perspective" consisting of a Sauron-like power to observe the whole of Middle-earth. The sequence ends fittingly, in her opinion, with Mordor and the Eye of Sauron, bringing the viewer, like Saruman, to meet the Enemy's gaze. As a consequence of Jackson's exclusion of The Scouring of the Shire, Saruman is killed by Wormtongue much earlier (at the beginning of the extended edition of The Lord of the Rings: The Return of the King), while Gandalf acquires the Orthanc palantír after Pippin retrieves it from Saruman's corpse, instead of having Wormtongue throw it from a window of the tower. Further, Sauron uses the Palantír to show Aragorn a dying Arwen, (a scene from the future) in the hope of weakening his resolve.

Influence 

The software data-collection company Palantir Technologies was named by its founder, Peter Thiel, after Tolkien's seeing stones.

An astronomical telescope at the Lowell Observatory, using a main mirror with spherical curvature, has the acronym PALANTIR. This stands for Precision Array of Large-Aperture New Telescopes for Image Reconstruction, and is meant to reference the "far-seeing stones in [The] Lord of the Rings".

References

Primary 
This list identifies each item's location in Tolkien's writings.

Secondary

Sources 

 
 
 
 
 
  
    
    

Middle-earth objects
Fictional balls
Magic items
de:Gegenstände in Tolkiens Welt#Die Palantíri
pl:Lista artefaktów Śródziemia#Palantíry